Oceàna is an opera in three acts composed by Antonio Smareglia to a libretto in Italian by . It premiered at La Scala on 22 January 1903 in a performance conducted by Arturo Toscanini.

Roles

Synopsis
Setting: a village in Roman Syria
A beautiful young woman, Nersa, is being wooed by the elderly Vadar. Nersa is fascinated when Ers, a sea spirit, tells her mysterious tales of life in the sea and of Init, the god of the waters. When her village decides to punish her for trying to leave, Uls (another sea spirit disguised as an old man) suggests that her punishment should be to spend three days and nights alone on the seashore. While she is there, Init appears, accompanied by his water nymphs and sirens, and courts Nersa, naming her Oceàna. Vadar and his brother, Hareb, arrive in a boat. Init orders the sirens to drive the men insane. As Hareb starts to go mad, Nersa reluctantly says farewell to the sea and returns to the village with Vadar. Although she agrees to marry Vadar, she still dreams of Init. On the day of Nersa and Vadar's wedding, Init appears and convinces Nersa to flee with him. Vadar discovers them in an embrace and decides to free Nersa from her promise of marriage, asking only that the god cure Hareb of his insanity and instead make Vadar insane. For Vadar, life has no meaning without his beloved Nersa.

Recording
The 13 minute overture to Oceàna can be heard on:Antonio Smareglia: Ouvertures e Intermezzi – Orchestra Sinfonica Lituana di Vilnjus,  (conductor). Label: Bongiovanni 2142

References

Sources
Gelli, Piero (ed.), "Oceana", Dizionario dell'Opera, Baldini Castoldi Dalai, 2007, . Accessed 2 May 2009.

Further reading
Šverko, Orietta, "Il teatro lirico smaregliano", La Voce del Popolo'', 5 April 2005, Section: Palcoscenico, p. 6. Accessed 2 May 2009.

Operas
Italian-language operas
1903 operas
Operas by Antonio Smareglia
Opera world premieres at La Scala
Operas set in the Levant